The Curtiss XP-18 was ordered in 1930 and was to have been a single-seat biplane powered by a Wright IV-1560 engine. The design was cancelled before Curtiss constructed any.

References

Cancelled military aircraft projects of the United States
P-18
Single-engine aircraft
Biplanes